Caladenia interanea, commonly known as the inland spider orchid, is a plant in the orchid family Orchidaceae and is endemic to the Eyre Peninsula in South Australia. It is a ground orchid with a single hairy leaf and a single green flower with dark red stripes.

Description
Flowering occurs from August to October.

Taxonomy and naming
The inland spider orchid was first formally described in 2005 by David Jones, who gave it the name Arachnorchis interanea and published the description in The Orchadian from a specimen collected in the Gawler Ranges. In 2008, Robert Bates changed the name to Caladenia interanea. The specific epithet (interanea) is a Latin word meaning "inward", "interior" or "internal".

Distribution and habitat
Caladenia interanea occurs in the Eyre Peninsula region, especially the Gawler Ranges where it grows in rocky places.

References

External links
 

interanea
Plants described in 2005
Endemic orchids of Australia
Orchids of South Australia
Taxa named by David L. Jones (botanist)
Taxa named by Robert John Bates